Leam Nathan Richardson (born 19 November 1979) is an English  professional football manager and former player who was most recently the manager of Wigan Athletic. 
As a player, Richardson played for Blackburn Rovers, Bolton Wanderers, Notts County, Blackpool and Accrington Stanley, whilst he has held coaching roles previously at Accrington Stanley, and Chesterfield.

Playing career

Born in Leeds, West Yorkshire, Richardson started his career at Blackburn Rovers. He made his debut in a 1–0 loss against Leeds United in the Football League Cup on 13 October 1999.

On 13 July 2000 he moved to Bolton Wanderers for £50000. He made his debut in the Trotters' 1–1 draw against Burnley in the Football League First Division on 12 August 2000.

In 2001, Richardson played his part in helping Bolton to return to the Premier League via the play-offs when they defeated Preston North End in the final at the Millennium Stadium in Cardiff.

In 2001–02 he moved on loan to Notts County. He made his debut in a 1–1 draw against Cambridge United in the FA Cup on 17 November 2001.

In 2002–03 season he moved on loan to Blackpool. He made his debut in a 3–0 win against Peterborough United in the Football League Second Division on 21 December 2002. He was sent off against Huddersfield Town on 1 January 2003.

On 23 June 2003 he joined Blackpool on a free transfer. He made his debut in a 5–0 loss against Queens Park Rangers on 9 August 2003. He scored his first goal for the club against Oldham Athletic in the FA Cup on 6 December 2003. Richardson played as a substitute in the victorious 2004 Football League Trophy Final.

On 10 May 2005, he was released from the club along with Robert Clare.

On 13 August 2005 he joined Accrington Stanley on a free transfer on non-contract terms. He made his debut against Canvey Island in the Football Conference on 13 August 2005. He scored his first goal against Brentford in League Two on 26 February 2008.

Managerial career

Accrington Stanley and assistant manager roles
In January 2012, Richardson became the caretaker manager of Accrington Stanley, after John Coleman departed to join Rochdale. On 28 January, Richardson took charge of his first match in charge: at home to Gillingham, which they won 4–3 and briefly moved into a play-off position for the first time that season.

Accrington appointed Paul Cook as their new permanent manager the following month, though Richardson was re-appointed as manager after Cook left to become manager of Chesterfield that October. Originally employed as caretaker manager for a second spell, he was appointed as the manager of the club on a permanent basis from 1 November, signing a two-and-a-half-year deal.

On 30 April 2013, it was announced that Richardson had left Accrington in order to re-unite with Paul Cook, becoming his new assistant manager at Chesterfield. The two would later move on to manage Portsmouth in 2015, winning promotion to League One in 2017.

Wigan Athletic
On 31 May 2017, Richardson once again followed Cook to Wigan Athletic, once again acting as his assistant manager. He and Cook oversaw Wigan's promotion to the Championship in their first season in charge, and kept them there for two seasons.

Following a takeover in mid-2020, Wigan collapsed into administration and were relegated after being punished with a –12 point deduction. Cook resigned as manager on 4 August 2020 and Richardson was appointed to take charge of training duties until further notice. John Sheridan was appointed as the club's new permanent manager, but he left after just 15 games to join Swindon Town, and Richardson was named caretaker manager. Following Wigan's takeover in March 2021, the new owners stated that Richardson would continue in his caretaker manager role until the end of the season. 

Despite this, Richardson was appointed as the permanent manager of the club on 21 April 2021 with three games still remaining. Richardson confirmed that Cook, who had recently been appointed manager of Ipswich Town, had asked him to join him in Suffolk as his assistant again, but he declined so he could remain at Wigan. He insisted however that there was no ill-will on either side and that they remain on good terms. He was able to keep Wigan up, avoiding relegation to League Two.

In November 2021 Wigan striker Charlie Wyke collapsed during training after suffering a cardiac arrest. Following his discharge from hospital Wyke praised Richardson's swift initiation of CPR saying: "...my life has been saved by the actions of the gaffer [Leam Richardson] and the club doctor Jonathan Tobin..." 

On 24 April 2022, Richardson was named the 2021–22 EFL League One Manager of the Season at the league's annual award ceremony. Later that month Richardson led Wigan to promotion into the Championship as they finished the season as League One champions.

On 10 November 2022, Richardson was sacked as Wigan manager after a run of six losses in seven matches that saw the club fall into the Championship relegation zone. The sacking came just sixteen days after Richardson had signed a new three-year contract with the club.

Managerial statistics 
As of 8 November 2022

Honours
Wigan Athletic
EFL League One: 2021–22
Individual
EFL League One Manager of the Season: 2021–22

References

External links

1979 births
Footballers from Leeds
Living people
Association football fullbacks
English footballers
Blackburn Rovers F.C. players
Bolton Wanderers F.C. players
Notts County F.C. players
Blackpool F.C. players
Accrington Stanley F.C. players
Premier League players
English Football League players
National League (English football) players
Football managers from Leeds
Accrington Stanley F.C. managers
Wigan Athletic F.C. managers
English Football League managers